Kirill Sergeyevich Stremousov (26 December 1976 – 9 November 2022) was a Ukrainian collaborationist politician and blogger who served as the deputy head of the Kherson military–civilian administration in Russian-occupied Ukraine from 26 April 2022 until his death on 9 November 2022, just before Russia ordered a retreat from Kherson.

Early life 
Stremousov was born on 26 December 1976 in Holmivskyi, Donetsk Oblast, Ukrainian SSR, USSR. He graduated from the Ternopil Academy of National Economy. He owned a fish feed company for five years. Stremousov later became the head of the Henichesk Fish Inspectorate. In 2007, he was given a leading position in Kyiv's Fisheries Committee. Shortly after, he resigned and left for Kherson.

Following his arrival in Kherson, Stremousov founded an NGO "Tavria News" and went on a trip to the Americas. He described his motorbike trip across Latin America as an "epic journey in search of himself", seeing himself as following in the footsteps of his "hero", the Argentinian Marxist revolutionary Che Guevara.

Conspiracy theories and political career in Ukraine 
After returning from America, Stremousov became a prolific blogger, described by the Guardian as a "petty troublemaker" who "propagand[ized] some of the many conspiracy theories that had sprung up in the post-Soviet sphere", and a "marginal figure" in politics. 

He conducted seminars on a mystical approach to a healthy lifestyle and became a follower of the post-Soviet neo-Pagan and neo-Stalinist conspiracy theory Concept of Public Security. The conspiracy theory has also been described by the Guardian as having "strong antisemitic undertones".

In 2013, Stremousov was one of the organizers of the "Russian runs", which were to show Kherson the "strength of the Russian spirit". In December 2013, he founded the organization "For the President", which provided explicit support to the pro-Russian President Viktor Yanukovych.

In January 2016, he co-founded the Ukrainian Center for Environmental Self-Defense. In February 2017, he beat a police officer during a fight in the city council. On 6 April he was involved in the attack on the SBU convoy.

In late 2017, Stremousov faced backlash and coverage from international tabloids after he filmed himself spinning his four months old daughter around his head by her legs. While doing this, he said that he could hear “her bones are popping.” The newspaper The Financial Express called Stremousov "heartless" and emphasized that he ignored the screams of the baby.

On 8 October 2018, he was named the head of the Kherson branch of the Socialist Party of Ukraine (SPU). On 18 January 2019, he was part of a group that fired at the Novy Den newspaper in Kherson. For this he was suspected of hooliganism and expelled from the SPU. In the 2019 Ukrainian parliamentary election he was a candidate for the People's Deputy of Ukraine as a self-nominated candidate in the 82nd constituency, receiving 1.74% of the vote.

During the COVID-19 pandemic, Stremousov started promoting anti-vaccination beliefs and conspiracy theories. In his videos he accused the authorities of spreading COVID-19, spoke about "US biolabs in Ukraine", and urged residents not to wear masks and not to adhere to restrictions. His YouTube channel was eventually blocked for spreading COVID misinformation.
On 18 June 2020, he attacked journalist Dmytro Bagnenko and was involved in a criminal case under the article on obstruction of the journalist's work. In August 2020, the SBU conducted searches of Stremousov's properties as part of criminal proceedings to expose the Russian FSB.

In the 2020 local elections he unsuccessfully ran for the post of mayor of Kherson as a self-nominated candidate, receiving just over 1% of the vote. Stremousov became a member of the pro-Russian Derzhava party in 2021.

2022 Russian invasion of Ukraine 
Following the 2022 Russian invasion of Ukraine and the occupation of Kherson Oblast, Stremousov took a pro-Russian position. On 16 March 2022, Stremousov and other local pro-Russian activists held a meeting of the collaborationist Salvation Committee for Peace and Order in the building of the Kherson Regional Administration. The following day, the Ukrainian government accused Stremousov of treason for his role in this meeting and opened criminal proceedings against him.

On 26 April 2022, Stremousov was appointed by the Kremlin the deputy governor of the Kherson Military-Civilian Administration. Analysing this choice, The Guardian later said that "with much of the Kherson Ukrainian administration gone or refusing to serve the Russians, Moscow turned to figures such as Stremousov to try to give an appearance of legitimacy to their occupation."

In an indication of an intended split from Ukraine, Stremousov announced two days later that the region would switch its currency to the Russian ruble the following month. Additionally, citing unnamed reports that alleged discrimination against Russian speakers, Stremousov said that "reintegrating the Kherson region back into a Nazi Ukraine is out of the question". On 11 May 2022, Stremousov announced his readiness to turn to President Vladimir Putin with a request for Kherson Oblast to join the Russian Federation, expressing his wish that there would be no referendum held or a declaration of an independent "Kherson People's Republic" before the annexation. After this announcement, leaflets started appearing around Kherson offering a ₴500,000 reward for Stremousov's assassination.

On 30 May, he spoke about exporting grain from Kherson to Russia: “We have space to store (the new crop) although we have a lot of grain here. People are now partially taking it out, having agreed with those who buy it from the Russian side." Stremousov also worked on selling sunflower seeds.

On 3 June 2022, Stremousov was sanctioned by the European Union for providing support and promoting policies that undermine the territorial integrity, sovereignty and independence of Ukraine.

Analysis of a video made by Stremousov during the Ukrainian counter-attack on Kherson started on 29 August 2022 shows landmarks in the background that identify the location as the Marriott Hotel at 38 Revolyutsii Avenue, Voronezh, a  city in southwestern Russia  from Kherson. This is interpreted as being due to his having fled. When asked about his location, Stremousov said he was "travelling around Russian cities, meeting different people for work".

On 28 September Stremousov received a Russian passport.

Amid the ongoing Ukrainian counteroffensive in the Kherson region, on 6 October Stremousov expressed dissatisfaction with "incompetent commanders" and blamed Russian defense minister Sergei Shoigu for having "allowed this situation to happen", adding that many suggest the minister should shoot himself.

Death 
On 9 November 2022, Stremousov died in an apparent car crash near Henichesk, Russia's de facto headquarters in the region, at the age of 45. His death came hours prior to Russia's official retreat from the city of Kherson. 

Stremousov was buried on 11 November in Simferopol. His funeral was attended by First Deputy Chief of Staff of the Presidential Administration of Russia Sergey Kiriyenko, as well as by the head of the Kherson administration Volodymyr Saldo and by the head of the Zaporizhzhia administration Yevgeny Balitsky.

Reactions 
President Vladimir Putin posthumously awarded Stremousov the Order of Courage. The Russia-backed administration of the Kherson Oblast promised to name a street after Stremousov in the city of Kherson and erect a statue to commemorate his life.
In a post on the Telegram messaging app, Sergey Aksyonov, head of the Russia-annexed Crimea Peninsula, called Stremousov a “true fighter” and a “Russian patriot”.

Ukrainian legislator Oleksiy Honcharenko called Stremousov "a traitor who went over to the side of Russia," noting, "He actively opposed the surrender of Kherson and said that Russia is here forever. And then he mysteriously dies."

References

External links 

1976 births
2022 deaths
COVID-19 conspiracy theorists
People from Horlivka
Recipients of the Order of Courage
Road incident deaths in Ukraine
Russian nationalists
Socialist Party of Ukraine politicians
Ternopil National Economic University alumni
Ukrainian collaborators with Russia during the 2022 Russian invasion of Ukraine
Civilians killed in the Russian invasion of Ukraine